Bucklandiella is a genus of moss in the family Grimmiaceae.

The genus name of Bucklandiella is in honour of William Buckland (1784 – 1856), an English theologian who became Dean of Westminster. He was also a geologist and palaeontologist.

The genus was circumscribed by Heikki Roivainen in Ann. Bot. Fenn. Vol.9 on page 116 in 1972.

Species 
 Bucklandiella affinis
 Bucklandiella afoninae
 Bucklandiella allanfifei
 Bucklandiella brevipes
 Bucklandiella elegans
 Bucklandiella heterosticha
 Bucklandiella lawtoniae
 Bucklandiella longtonii
 Bucklandiella macounii
 Bucklandiella microcarpa
 Bucklandiella obesa
 Bucklandiella occidentalis
 Bucklandiella pacifica
 Bucklandiella sudetica
 Bucklandiella venusta

References 

 Bednarek-Ochyra, H.; Ochyra, R. 2010: Bucklandiella allanfifei (Grimmiaceae), a new moss species from New Zealand, with a note on South American B. striatipila. Journal of bryology, 32(4), pages 245–255, 
 Bednarek-Ochyra, H.; Ochyra, R. 2011: Bucklandiella angustissima sp. nov. (Grimmiaceae), a new austral amphipacific species with the smallest capsules and the shortest setae in the genus. Cryptogamie bryologie, 32(1), pages 13–28

External links 
 
 
 Bucklandiella at The Plant List
 Bucklandiella at Tropicos

Moss genera
Grimmiales